Mark E. Seremet is the CEO of Zoo Games. and the CEO of Spreadshirt from 2005 to 2006.  In addition, he helped found Paragon Software, who developed a few of the first video games based from the Marvel Comics characters.

He earned his BA from Saint Vincent College.

Sources 

American chief executives
Living people
Video game businesspeople
Year of birth missing (living people)